The Mozilla Archive Format (MAFF) is a legacy Web archive file format that was provided by Firefox through an extension,  used to store one or more web pages with their associated audio, video, and other related web resources to a single file. Unlike MHTML, which uses MIME encoding within a single HTML file, MAFF compresses the page into a ZIP container file.

The extension supported versions of Firefox from 2007 to 2018 but not later, and there are no plans to update it. It continued to be supported in Cyberfox and Waterfox, forks of Firefox that try to keep features removed from Firefox like the traditional extension API. Browser extension WebScrapBook (with assistant PyWebScrapBook), available for Firefox 57+ and Chromium-based browsers, supports saving and opening MAFF files. Pale Moon extension MozArchiver, a fork of the original extension, provides the same support for Pale Moon 26.0 and newer.

Existing files in the discontinued .maff format can be accessed by extracting the internal folders and files with an unarchiver such as 7-Zip. It also allows for automatic processing, e.g. as ZIP-type in local search machines (like DocFetcher). Pale Moon allows .maff files to be opened in MS Windows.

Format licensing
MAFF is an open file format. The file format specification is published.

See also
 data URI scheme
 Microsoft Compiled HTML Help
 MHTML
 Webarchive
 SingleFileZ

External links 
 
  — direct links to the XPI files might require non-Firefox based browsers (or older Firefox based) in order to download.
 About the MAFF file format
 User Manual of Firefox Addon MAF - Mozilla Archive Format, with MHT and Faithful Save
 MAFF format as option in WebScrapBook for Firefox
 MAFF format as option in WebScrapBook for Chrome browsers (Chrome, Chromium etc.)

Sources cited

Web Archives
Archive formats
Firefox